The following is a list of women who have traveled into space, sorted by date of first flight. This list includes Russian cosmonauts, who were the first women in outer space travelers. Valentina Tereshkova became the first woman to go to space in 1963, very early in crewed space exploration, and it would be almost twenty years before another flew (Svetlana Savitskaya).

Female astronauts went on to become commonplace in the 1980s and beyond. By 2019, roughly 12% of all the space travelers were women. , there were 73 women with completed spaceflights.

History 
, of the 621 total space travelers (FAI), 70 have been women. There have been one each from France, Italy, South Korea, and the United Kingdom; two each from Canada, China, and Japan; five from the Soviet Union/Russia; and 55 from the United States. The time between the first male and first female astronauts varied widely by country. The first astronauts originally from Britain, South Korea, and Iran were women, while there was a two-year gap in Russia from the first man in space on Vostok1 to the first woman in space on Vostok6. The time between the first American man and first American woman in space was 22 years between Freedom 7 and STS-7, respectively. For China, this interval was almost eight and a half years between the Shenzhou 5 and Shenzhou 9 space missions, and for Italy, there was approximately twelve years between the STS-46 and Expedition 42 spaceflights.

A span of 19 years separated the two women in space. They were cosmonauts on the Vostok 6 and Soyuz T-7 missions. Though the Soviet Union sent the first two women into space, only five of the women in space have been Russian or Soviet citizens. However, British, French, Italian, dual-citizen Iranian-American and South Korean women have all flown as part of the Soviet and Russian space programs. Similarly, women from Canada, Japan, and America have all flown under the US space program. A span of one year separated the first and second American women in space, as well as the first and second Chinese women in space, taking place on consecutive missions, Shenzhou 9 and Shenzhou 10.

Spacefarers with completed spaceflights

Other astronauts and astronaut candidates

See also
 Chinese women in space
 Mercury 13—the Women in Space Program (WISP)
 List of space travelers by name—all people who have flown in Space
 List of space travelers by nationality
 List of astronauts by name—people trained to serve as spaceflight crew

References 

 
Female
Astonauts
Women in space
Feminism-related lists